Marko Avramović may refer to:

 Marko Avramović (water polo) (born 1986), Serbian water polo player
 Marko Avramović (footballer) (born 1987), Serbian football midfielder